Trigonotylus pulcher is a species of plant bug in the family Miridae. It is found in Central America and North America.

References

 Thomas J. Henry, Richard C. Froeschner. (1988). Catalog of the Heteroptera, True Bugs of Canada and the Continental United States. Brill Academic Publishers.

Further reading

 

Insects described in 1876
Stenodemini